Al Shagub (also spelled Al Shaqab) is a district of Al Rayyan City in Qatar, located in the municipality of Al Rayyan. As the district houses the universities in Qatar Foundation's educational project Education City, the district itself is sometimes referred to as Education City. Qatar Foundation has played a major role in developing the district.

History
J.G. Lorimer's Gazetteer of the Persian Gulf gives an account of Al Shagub in 1908. He describes it as a "Bedouin camping ground" that is "7 miles west of Dohah and a little north-east of Maraikh". He goes on to write "there is a fort here with a masonry well, 6 fathoms deep, of good water inside; it is on the way from Dohah to Wajbah."

Infrastructure

The district houses Education City's university campuses, including Carnegie Mellon University in Qatar, Texas A&M University at Qatar, and Georgetown University in Qatar. The Qatar National Library is also in the district. Other facilities affiliated with Qatar Foundation are situated in Al Shagub and the nearby north-bound districts of Gharrafat Al Rayyan and Al Gharrafa.

The Al Shaqab Equestrian Center is located towards the southern edge of the district. Al Shaqab Fort is found near the original site of the equestrian center. To the immediate south of the equestrian center is the Al Rayyan Municipal Office in the district of Old Al Rayyan.

Transport
The underground Al Shaqab station currently serves the Green Line of the Doha Metro. It is located on Huwar Street in Old Al Rayyan, near its border with Al Shagub. The station was opened to the public on 10 December, 2019 along with the other Green Line stations.

References

Populated places in Al Rayyan